Martin County is a county located in the U.S. state of North Carolina. As of the 2020 census, the population was 22,031. Its county seat is Williamston.

History
The county was formed in 1774 from the southeastern part of Halifax County and the western part of Tyrrell County.  It was named for Josiah Martin, the last royal governor of North Carolina (1771–75).  Whereas Dobbs County and Tryon County, named for Martin's predecessors Arthur Dobbs and William Tryon, were abolished after American independence, Martin County was neither abolished nor renamed, a fact which has been attributed to the popularity of Alexander Martin, twice governor of the state (1782–84, 1789–92).

The Martin County Courthouse was listed on the National Register of Historic Places in 1979.

Geography

State and local protected areas/sites 
 Fort Branch Confederate Earthen Fort Civil War Site
 Foxtale Hunting Preserve
 Lower Roanoke River Wetlands Game Land
 Jamesville Wildlife Preserve

Major water bodies 
 Conoho Creek
 Etheridge Creek
 Gardiners Creek
 Hardison Mill Creek
 Long Creek
 Roanoke River
 Smithwick Creek
 Tranters Creek
 Welch Creek

Adjacent counties
 Bertie County – northeast
 Washington County – east
 Beaufort County – southeast
 Pitt County – southwest
 Edgecombe County – west
 Halifax County – northwest

Major highways

  (Concurrency with US 64 and US 17)

Major infrastructure 
 Marin County Airport

Demographics

2020 census

As of the 2020 United States census, there were 22,031 people, 9,378 households, and 6,195 families residing in the county.

2000 census
As of the census of 2000, there were 25,593 people, 10,020 households, and 7,194 families residing in the county. The population density was 56 people per square mile (21/km2). There were 10,930 housing units at an average density of 24 per square mile (9/km2). The racial makeup of the county was 52.54% White, 45.37% Black or African American, 0.29% Native American, 0.24% Asian, 0.03% Pacific Islander, 0.90% from other races, and 0.63% from two or more races. 2.06% of the population were Hispanic or Latino of any race.

There were 10,020 households, out of which 31.60% had children under the age of 18 living with them, 50.30% were married couples living together, 17.60% had a female householder with no husband present, and 28.20% were non-families. 25.70% of all households were made up of individuals, and 11.90% had someone living alone who was 65 years of age or older. The average household size was 2.53 and the average family size was 3.02.

In the county, the population was spread out, with 25.50% under the age of 18, 7.50% from 18 to 24, 26.80% from 25 to 44, 25.00% from 45 to 64, and 15.20% who were 65 years of age or older. The median age was 39 years. For every 100 females there were 86.50 males. For every 100 females age 18 and over, there were 81.80 males.

The median income for a household in the county was $28,793, and the median income for a family was $35,428. Males had a median income of $29,818 versus $19,167 for females. The per capita income for the county was $15,102. About 16.30% of families and 20.20% of the population were below the poverty line, including 27.50% of those under age 18 and 25.70% of those age 65 or over.

Law and government
Martin County is a member of the Mid-East Commission regional council of governments.

Politics 
Martin County is a historically Democratic county; in 2004, it voted Republican for only the fourth time, the first three having been in the Republican landslides of 1872, 1972, and 1984. Barack Obama won the county back for the Democratic Party in both 2008 and 2012, but in 2016, it narrowly backed Donald Trump. In 2020, it narrowly supported Trump again, voting for a losing Republican nominee for the first time ever. On the same day, Martin County voted to reelect Democratic Governor Roy Cooper in the North Carolina gubernatorial election.

Education
The primary and secondary public school functions are performed by Martin County Schools, a district covering the entire county. Martin Community College is located in Williamston.

Communities

Towns
 Bear Grass
 Everetts
 Hamilton
 Hassell
 Jamesville
 Oak City
 Parmele
 Robersonville
 Williamston (county seat and largest town)

Townships

 Bear Grass
 Cross Roads
 Goose Nest
 Griffins
 Hamilton
 Jamesville
 Poplar Point
 Robersonville
 Williams
 Williamston

Notable people
 Annie Moore Cherry
 Wilber Hardee, founder of Hardee's
 William Drew Robeson I, minister of Witherspoon Street Presbyterian Church

See also
 List of counties in North Carolina
 National Register of Historic Places listings in Martin County, North Carolina
 North Carolina in the American Civil War
 List of future Interstate Highways

References

External links

 
 
 NCGenWeb Martin County – free genealogy resources for the county

 
1774 establishments in North Carolina
Populated places established in 1774